Betty Mathilde Hennings née Schnell (1850–1939) was a Danish actress who entered the Royal Danish Theatre as a ballet dancer but in 1870 turned to acting, first performing in Molière's The School for Wives. She later became known for her roles in the plays of Henrik Ibsen, especially as Nora in A Doll's House.

Biography
Born on 26 October 1850 in Copenhagen, Betty Mathilde Schnell was the daughter of the tailor Stig Jørgen Schnell (1816–70) and Regine Sophie Dorothea Schmidt (1819–81). On 25 July 1877, she married the music publisher and composer Henrik Hennings.

She trained as a ballet dancer at the Royal Danish Theatre under August Bournonville who recognized her talents, giving her leading roles including Hilde in A Folk Tale and promoting her to solo dancer in 1869. But her potential was also noticed by the dramatist Frederik Høedt who encouraged her to become an actress. She decided to accept his offer, preferring a more relaxed career on the stage to that of a ballet dancer.

Her theatre début was in 1870 when she played Agnès in Molière's The School for Wives. As she matured, she began to perform in a number of Ibsen's plays, including Nora in A Doll's House, Hedvig in The Wild Duck, the title role in Hedda Gabler, and Ellida in The Lady from the Sea. She starred in other Scandinavian works, such as those by Bjørnstjerne Bjørnson, Holger Drachmann and Gunnar Heiberg but also performed in a variety of other dramas, including Shakespeare's Hamlet, playing Ophelia and later Gertrude, and as Schiller's Maria Stuart.

In later life, Hennings continued to act in Ibsen's plays, taking on increasingly mature roles. One of her later roles was Clara in Gustav Wied's Skærmydsler. On her retirement in 1908, she was acclaimed as the first lady of the Royal Theatre. All in all, she had played 170 parts in almost 3,000 performances.

Betty Hennings died on 27 October 1939 in Gentofte.

List of roles

Royal Danish Yjeatre
 1861	Julestuen as Anne
 1861	Ludlams hule as Betty
 1865	Julestuen as	Marie
 1867	Købmanden i Venedig asJessica, Shylocks datter
 1870	Fruentimmerskolen as Agnete
 1871	Fejltagelserne as Frøken Trine
 1873	Pernilles korte frøkenstand as Leonora
 1874	Det lykkelige skibbrud as Pige
 1875	Henrik og Pernille as Leonore
 1876	Maskerade as Leonora
 1877	Jacob von Tyboe as Lucilia
 1878	Fruentimmerskolen as	Agnete
 1878	Henrik og Pernille as Leonore
 1879	Et dukkehjem as Nora, Helmers hustru
 1879	Pernilles korte frøkenstand as Leonora
 1880	Den vægelsindede as Leonora
 1880	Stor staahej for ingenting as Hero
 1882	Den forvandlede brudgom as Leonora
 1884	Den politiske kandestøber as Raadsherreinde
 1884	Den stundesløse as Leonore
 1884	Hamlet as Ophelia
 1884	Maskerade as	Leonora
 1884	Ulysses von Ithacia as Iris
 1885	Den politiske kandestøber as Raadsherreinde
 1885	Vildanden as	Hedvig
 1888	Barselstuen as Barselskone
 1888	Den politiske kandestøber as Raadsherreinde
 1889	Pernilles korte frøkenstand as Leonora
 1891	Hedda Gabler as	Hedda Tesman
 1893	Bygmester Solness as Hilde Wangel
 1893	Et vintereventyr as Hermione
 1895	Lille Eyolf as Asta Allmers
 1897	John Gabriel Borkman as Ella Rentheim
 1900	Naar vi døde vaagner as Irene
 1900	Richard III as Elisabeth
 1901	Kong Lear	
 1901	Skærmydsler as Clara
 1903	Et vintereventyr as Hermione
 1905	Gengangere as Fru Helene Alving
 1908	Tunge veje as Fra Wedekind
 1910	Hamlet as Dronning Gertrud
 1921	Moderen as Moderen
 1922	Det gamle hjem as Urania, Rabes datter

Odense Theatre
 1918	Det gamle hjem	 as rania, Rabes datter
 1918	Gengangere as Fru Helene Alving
 1918 Hvor man keder sig as Hertuginden af Reville

References

Danish ballerinas
19th-century Danish actresses
Danish stage actresses
20th-century Danish actresses
1850 births
1939 deaths
Actresses from Copenhagen
19th-century Danish ballet dancers